Bereznik is a rural locality (a village) in Novlenskoye Rural Settlement, Vologodsky District, Vologda Oblast, Russia. The population was 451 as of 2002.

Geography 
Bereznik is located 71 km northwest of Vologda (the district's administrative centre) by road. Mitenskoye is the nearest rural locality.

References 

Rural localities in Vologodsky District
Vologodsky Uyezd